Yuck is the debut eponomyous studio album by English indie rock band Yuck. The album was released on CD and digital download on 15 February 2011 on the Fat Possum Records label in the United States and on 21 February 2011 on the Mercury Records label in the United Kingdom.

Background
Daniel Blumberg and Max Bloom left their previous group Cajun Dance Party in 2008. They formed Yuck in 2009 in London, England. The pair released two singles on vinyl only ("Rubber" and "Georgia") in early 2010 and recruited Jonny Rogoff on drums and Mariko Doi on bass (who had just recently left the group Levelload) shortly after. The group began recording its debut studio album in the summer of the same year in London in Max Bloom's parents' house.

Yuck released its debut single "Holing Out" on 20 February 2011.

Critical reception

Yuck received positive reviews from music critics. At Metacritic, which assigns a normalized rating out of 100 to reviews from mainstream critics, the album received an average score of 81, based on 35 reviews, indicating "universal acclaim". Tim Sendra of AllMusic called it "an impressively assured debut from such a young band" and wrote that the band's" love of shoegaze and loud/quiet '90s guitar rock is unadulterated and it translates into the songs and the sound, making it a pure and easy-to-love album for all those who have ever been fans themselves." Sam Majeske of Consequence of Sound described it as "a refreshingly diverse album consisting of a dozen songs as enthralling as those from any of the band’s influences." J. Edward Keyes of Rolling Stones wrote, "Yuck channel their college-rock jones with skill and charm, balancing in-the-red guitar fuzz with melodic sweetness." Critics have also compared their sound to other bands such as My Bloody Valentine, Dinosaur Jr., Sonic Youth, and Pavement. Stereogum placed the album at number 13 on its list of the "Top 50 Albums of 2011", with Spin placing the album at number 31 on its list of the "50 Best Albums of 2011".

Track listing
All songs written and composed by Daniel Blumberg & Max Bloom, except tracks 9 and 11 composed by Max Bloom.

Personnel
Yuck
Daniel Blumberg – vocals, guitar
Max Bloom – lead guitar, vocals 
Mariko Doi – bass
Jonny Rogoff – drums
Ilana Blumberg – backing vocals

Technical and design personnel 
 Yuck;– production
 Amir Amos;– drum production
 Marc Waterman Marc Waterman;–	drum engineering
 Nilesh Patel;– mastering
 Matt Pence & Max Bloom;– mixing
 Jou Bergman;–	band photo
 Keith Anderson;– management

References

2011 debut albums
Fat Possum Records albums
Mercury Records albums
Yuck (band) albums
Indie rock albums by British artists